Melica riograndensis is a species of grass in the family Poaceae that is endemic to Brazil.

Description
The leaf-sheaths are tubular, have one closed end, and are glabrous on surface. The main panicle branches are indistinct and almost racemose.

Spikelets are oblong, solitary, and have fertile spikelets that have filiformed pedicels. Both the upper and lower glumes are keelless, membranous, with obtuse apexes.

Its lemma have prominent lateral veins with papillose surface and acute apex. Its palea have dentated apex and papillose surface. The species' fruits have caryopsis with additional pericarp.

References

riograndensis
Endemic flora of Brazil
Flora of South America